St John's  Division, Suffolk is an electoral division of Suffolk which returns one county councillor to Suffolk County Council. It is located in the North East Area of Ipswich and consists of most of St John's Ward and part of Alexandra Ward of Ipswich Borough Council.

References

Electoral Divisions of Suffolk